is a subway station in Kōtō, Tokyo, Japan, jointly operated by Tokyo Metropolitan Bureau of Transportation (Toei) and Tokyo Metro. The station numbers are Z-12 for the Tokyo Metro Hanzomon Line and S-13 for the Toei Shinjuku Line.

Lines
Sumiyoshi Station is served by the following two lines.
 Toei Shinjuku Line (S-13)
 Tokyo Metro Hanzomon Line (Z-12)

Station layout
B1 level: Concourses
B2 level: Ticket halls/gates; Toei Shinjuku Line platforms
B3 level: Tokyo Metro Hanzomon Line platform 1 (for Shibuya)
B4 level: Tokyo Metro Hanzomon Line platform 2 (for Oshiage)

Toei platforms
Two side platforms serving two tracks. Here, passengers must choose their direction before passing through the ticket gates.

Tokyo Metro platforms
Originally built as two island platforms, one above the other, but only one side is used, and the other side, originally reserved for future extension plan to Toyosu, are used as stabling tracks.

History
The station opened on 21 December 1978, initially served by the Toei Shinjuku Line only. The Tokyo Metro platforms opened on 19 March 2003.

The station facilities of the Hanzōmon Line were inherited by Tokyo Metro after the privatization of the Teito Rapid Transit Authority (TRTA) in 2004.

Surrounding area
Sumiyoshi Station is located about 15 minutes' walk away from Kinshichō Station, one of Kōtō, Tokyo's largest shopping areas and also lies in close proximity to Sarueonshi Park.

See also
 List of railway stations in Japan

References

External links

 Toei station information 
 Tokyo Metro station information  

Railway stations in Tokyo
Railway stations in Japan opened in 1978